The 40th annual Berlin International Film Festival was held from 9 to 20 February 1990. The festival opened with Steel Magnolias by Herbert Ross, which was shown out of competition. The Golden Bear was awarded ex aequo to the American film Music Box directed by Costa-Gavras and Czechoslovak film Skřivánci na niti directed by Jiří Menzel. The retrospective of this edition included two programs: The Year 1945, dedicated to international productions released in 1945, and 40 Years Berlinale, dedicated to some of the most significant films presented during the past editions of the festival.

Jury

The following people were announced as being on the jury for the festival:
 Michael Ballhaus, director of photography (West Germany) - Jury President
 Margaret Ménégoz, producer - Jury Co-President (France)
 Vadim Abdrashitov, director (Soviet Union)
 Suzana Amaral, director and screenwriter (Brazil)
 Steven Bach, writer and producer (United States)
 Roberto Benigni, actor, director and screenwriter (Italy)
 Lívia Gyarmathy, director and screenwriter (Hungary)
 Helke Misselwitz, director and screenwriter (East Germany)
 Otto Sander, actor (West Germany)
 Stephen Silverman, actor (United States)
 Rita Tushingham, actress (United Kingdom)

Films in competition
The following films were in competition for the Golden Bear:

Out of competition
 300 mil do nieba, directed by Maciej Dejczer (Poland)
 Everybody Wins, directed by Karel Reisz (USA, United Kingdom)
 Crimes and Misdemeanors, directed by Woody Allen (USA)
 Steel Magnolias, directed by Herbert Ross (USA)
 A Terra-Cotta Warrior, directed by Ching Siu-tung (Hong Kong)
 Conte de printemps, directed by Éric Rohmer (France)
 Resan till Melonia, directed by Per Åhlin (Sweden)
 Spur der Steine, directed by Frank Beyer (East Germany)

Key
{| class="wikitable" width="550" colspan="1"
| style="background:#FFDEAD;" align="center"| †
|Winner of the main award for best film in its section
|-
| colspan="2"| The opening and closing films are screened during the opening and closing ceremonies respectively.
|}

Retrospective
The following films were shown in the retrospective titled "The Year 1945":

Awards

The following prizes were awarded by the Jury:
 Golden Bear:
 Music Box by Costa-Gavras
 Skřivánci na niti by Jiří Menzel
 Silver Bear – Special Jury Prize: Astenicheskiy sindrom by Kira Muratova
 Silver Bear for Best Director: Michael Verhoeven for Das schreckliche Mädchen
 Silver Bear for Best Joint Performance: Jessica Tandy and Morgan Freeman
 Silver Bear for Best Actor: Iain Glen for Silent Scream
 Silver Bear for an outstanding single achievement: Black Snow by Xie Fei
 Silver Bear for an outstanding artistic contribution: Coming Out
 Alfred-Bauer Prize: Karaul
FIPRESCI Award
Karaul by Aleksandr Rogozhkin

References

External links
40th Berlin International Film Festival 1990
1990 Berlin International Film Festival
Berlin International Film Festival:1990 at Internet Movie Database

40
1990 film festivals
1990 in Berlin
Berl
Berlin
February 1990 events in Europe